A transboundary river is a river that crosses at least one political border, either a border within a state or an international boundary. Bangladesh has the highest number of these rivers, with at least 58 major rivers that enter the country from the republic of India, including two of the world's largest rivers, the Ganges and the Brahmaputra. The Naf River is the only river that flows via Bangladesh into Myanmar.

The hydrologic and political effects of rivers that cross significant boundaries are enormous. Rivers have positive effects in that they carry a significant amount of sediment, which aids in building land in estuarine regions. However, this sediment raises the height of riverbeds, thereby causing flooding. International conventions governing water sharing have led to complex political disputes.

Major international transboundary rivers

External links
 Global Transboundary Protected Areas Network
 Universities Partnership for Transboundary Waters
 Publication and Information Resources
 Bibliography on Water Resources and International Law. Peace Palace Library

Notes